Satish Chandra (20 November 1922 – 13 October 2017) was an Indian  historian whose main area of specialisation was medieval Indian history.

Personal life
Satish Chandra was born in Meerut, Uttar Pradesh (then the United Provinces) to Sir Sita Ram, India's High Commissioner to Pakistan, and his wife, Basudevi.

He attended Allahabad University where he earned his B.A. (1942), M.A. (1944), and D.Phil. (1948) under the supervision of R.P. Tripathi. His doctoral thesis was on the Parties and Politics in 18th century India.

He was married to Savitri and had three sons.

Career
He taught at Allahabad University, Aligarh Muslim University, Delhi University, and Rajasthan University and was the Smuts' Visiting Professor at Cambridge in 1971. He was Professor of  History at Jawaharlal Nehru University (JNU) in New Delhi. Along with S. Gopal, Bipan Chandra, and Romila Thapar, he co-founded the Centre for Historical Studies at the School of Social Sciences in JNU. He was chairperson of the centre for a few years. He was the Secretary and President of the Indian History Congress.

Through the 1970s, he served as the vice chairman and chairman of the University Grants Commission of India. Among his various other appointments, he served in the council of the United Nations University, Tokyo between 1980 and 1986. He was an associated director of research at the Maison des Sciences de l'Homme as well as an executive board member at the International Congress of Historical Sciences, both in Paris. In 1988, he was asked by Union Public Service Commission to head a committee to review the system of appointments to the higher civil services.

Research and ideology

Chandra has been described as one of India's leading scholars of the Mughal period and one of India's most influential historians. His book, Medieval India, has been widely used as a textbook in schools and colleges around India.

He belonged to the group of historians, along with Romila Thapar, R. S. Sharma, Bipan Chandra and Arjun Dev, who are sometimes referred to as "left-leaning." In 2004, his textbook was reintroduced in the national curriculum after a hiatus of six years.

Selected books
 Books authored
 
 
 
 
 
 
 

 
 

Books edited
 
 
 India's Islamic Traditions, 711-1750 by Richard Maxwell Eaton, Oxford University Press 2003,

References

1922 births
2017 deaths
University of Allahabad alumni
Academic staff of Aligarh Muslim University
20th-century Indian historians
Historians of South Asia
21st-century Indian historians
People from Meerut
Scholars from Uttar Pradesh